Llurimagua Project is a copper and molybdenum mining project in Imbabura Province, Ecuador. It is named after Llurimagua, which is a community in the area.
Ecuadorean state mining company ENAMI and Chilean state-owned counterpart Corporacion Nacional del Cobre, or Codelco started advanced exploration in 2015 in the area's primary cloud forest after hundreds of police had to intervene to secure the area.

It is in Intag in the Cordillera de Toisán and includes 4,839 hectares.
Sampling in the area was done already. 
In China, there is interest in cooperation.

References 

Mining in Ecuador
Imbabura Province